Suos Yara (Khmer: សួស យ៉ារ៉ា; born 18 November 1973) is a Cambodian politician who serves as a spokesperson for the Cambodian People's Party.  He is a member of the National Assembly of Cambodia, representing the Preah Vihear constituency. He  also serves as a member the Central Committee of the Cambodian People's Party, and is a vice-chairman of its Commission for External Relations.

References

Cambodian People's Party politicians
Members of the National Assembly (Cambodia)
Living people
Place of birth missing (living people)
1973 births